Arthur Edgar "Rip" Ragan (June 5, 1878 – June 8, 1953) was a professional baseball player.  He was a right-handed pitcher for one season (1903) with the Cincinnati Reds.  For his career, he amassed a 0–2 record, with a 6.00 earned run average, and 7 strikeouts in 18 innings pitched.

He was born in Lincoln, Illinois and died in Kansas City, Missouri at the age of 75.

External links

1878 births
1953 deaths
Cincinnati Reds players
Major League Baseball pitchers
Baseball players from Illinois
Dallas Giants players
Birmingham Barons players
Augusta Tourists players
People from Lincoln, Illinois